Femina Miss India South is a beauty pageant established in 2008 for states in South India (Andhra Pradesh, Karnataka, Kerala, Tamil Nadu and Telangana). The final winners from each South Indian state are announced at the Miss South India finale event. Each of the winners from the five states will represent their state in the grand finale of the Femina Miss India pageant.

Format
Auditions are held in selected cities in the five states where the top 3 candidates will be chosen. After the selection of the 3 best candidates from the five states, the deserving candidate will be declared representative of that respective state and will be sent to the Femina Miss India grand final.

State titleholders and Placements 
The following are the list of winners of all the five South Indian states and their placements at the national Femina Miss India pageant.
Color key

National Titleholders and International Placements 
The following is a list of South Indian international representatives since 2008:

Mentor 
The franchise organises a mentor/coach to each zone to train the candidates for the final event.

2008-2013 
Only one candidate from whole of the five states was chosen to compete in the Femina Miss India pageant from 2008 to 2013.

Notelist

References

Femina Miss India
Beauty pageants in India